"I Don't Care" is a song by Finnish rock band Apocalyptica, the song was released in 2008 as the third and final single from their sixth album Worlds Collide and features Adam Gontier, then lead singer of Three Days Grace, on lead vocals. The song reached No. 1 on the Billboard Mainstream Rock Tracks chart for one week and No. 2 on the Alternative Songs chart where it spent a year in the top 20.

Meaning
Eicca Toppinen spoke about the song in an interview for Dutch metal webzine Zwaremetalen in 2007: "I wrote some of the lyrics to "I Don't Care." Max Martin wrote most of the lyrics, though. The song is about a fantasy and not about anyone in particular, but I think everyone can find a sense of truth in the lyrics."

Versions
There are two recorded versions of the song. The first one (length 3:57) was released in 2007 in Europe. Adam Gontier wanted to re-record the song for the US and Canada release of "Worlds Collide" in 2008 and that version is 3:41. In this radio edit version of the song, some explicit content of the lyrics, including the chorus's second half, are replaced. The radio edit version is available only on the single and the US and Canadian edition of the album. In a February 2008 interview for Brave Words and Bloody Knuckles magazine Eicca Toppinen from Apocalyptica explains why there are two versions of the song: "Actually we've reworked the song. Adam [Gontier] originally recorded his vocals in the spring (of 2007) with our producer (Jacob Hellner), but Adam wasn't entirely happy with the result. So a couple of weeks ago, Adam went to the studio with (Three Days Grace producer) Howard Benson to record a new version of the song. It's really great. It will actually be on the US/Canadian edition."

"I Don't Care" was based upon the instrumental track "Love Song", written by Eicca Toppinen for the Black Ice movie soundtrack.

In mid-2020, the original version became unavailable on streaming platforms for a currently unknown reason. It was then replaced with the instrumental version, only to have the original version brought back sometime in February 2021 (only confirmed for Spotify).

Music video
Speaking on the concept of the video, Eicca Topinnen said "It's going to be a bit freaky". "It'll be surrealistic in many ways, maybe a little bit in the spirit of Tim Burton. There's acrobats, strange-looking people doing strange things. It's going to be shot in an old house where nobody lives; it's a big mansion. It's really spooky. Of course, the director, Lisa Mann, is the only person who really knows at the moment, but it's exciting for us. She really wants to bring out the people inside the band. It feels completely different. It has a really special look."

The video shows the band playing in a decrepit house. The band plays in a small room with a low ceiling (Adam Gontier has to hunch over in order to stand). Next, the video shows members from the band and other women entering in and out of little doors. In the next scene, it shows the band, Gontier, and more women in a hallway standing still, dancing, walking and playing. Then, three women enter. In this dance sequence, the women dance around the three cello players, trying to seduce them, but they pay no attention. In a cutaway, it shows the three men playing. Cut back, and the three women sit in their laps. Then it shows the men playing the women like cellos. The following scene shows Gontier, rejecting a woman as she attempts to dance with him. In a cutaway scene continuing from the dance sequence, the women take their cellos away. In the last scene, it shows everybody in a room surrounding a table, eating, drinking, laughing, talking, dancing, and kissing. In the end, the band and Adam Gontier finished playing and a green light is shown shining behind them.

Chart performance
"I Don't Care" made it to No. 96 on the Billboard Hot 100 and peaked at #1 on 11.29.2008 Billboard Hot Rock Songs of the Decade chart.

In other media
The track was used in CW's series Smallville in season eight, episode 16, called "Turbulence".

Formats and track listings
 Maxi-CD
"I Don't Care" (US version)
"Severe Area" (main version)

Chart positions

Weekly charts

Year-end charts

Certifications

References

2008 singles
Apocalyptica songs
Rock ballads
Songs written by Max Martin
Songs written by Adam Gontier
Songs written by Eicca Toppinen
2007 songs
Jive Records singles